Gillian Mary Donaldson  (née Sheen; 21 August 1928 – 5 July 2021) was a British fencer and Olympic champion in foil competition. She won a gold medal in the women's individual foil event at the 1956 Summer Olympics in Melbourne. She also competed at the 1952 and 1960 Summer Olympics.

Fencing career 
Sheen first took up the sport while studying at North Forland School in Kent, and won the schoolgirls title in 1945. In 1947, she took the Junior Championships and went to University College Hospital in London to become a dental surgeon. In 1949, she won her first senior national title and took the British Universities title for five consecutive years. In 1951, she won a gold medal at the World Universities Championships.

Sheen participated in the 1952 Summer Olympics but was eliminated in the second round. She went back to the Olympics in 1956 and took the gold medal for Great Britain. She won with a classic technique in a period when advancing athleticism was changing the sport. The press hailed her as a middle-class figure and emphasized her age (28) and gender so that she was seen as a "dark horse" competitor.

She participated at the 1950 World Fencing Championships in Monte Carlo, where she won a bronze medal in Team Foil  with the British team. She represented England and won a silver medal in the individual foil at the 1954 British Empire and Commonwealth Games in Vancouver, Canada. Four years later she won the gold medal in the same event at the 1958 British Empire and Commonwealth Games in Cardiff. She competed until 1963, winning her tenth and final British Championship in 1960.

Personal life
Sheen was born in Willesden in London on 21 August 1928. In 1962 she married Bob Donaldson, an American orthodontist, and  moved to the United States. In 1966, she set up a dental and orthodontic practice with her husband in Auburn, NY, where she worked until her husband's death in 2004. She was appointed Member of the Order of the British Empire (MBE) in the 2019 Birthday Honours for services to UK sport.

Death 
Sheen died in Auburn, New York, on 5 July 2021, aged 92. She is survived by four children; her memorial service was held at the Episcopal Church of Saints Peter and John.

Books 
 Sheen, Gillian (1958). Instructions to Young Fencers. Museum Press. .

References

External links
 

1928 births
2021 deaths
British female fencers
Commonwealth Games gold medallists for England
Commonwealth Games medallists in fencing
Commonwealth Games silver medallists for England
English dentists
English emigrants to the United States
English fencers
English Olympic medallists
Fencers at the 1952 Summer Olympics
Fencers at the 1956 Summer Olympics
Fencers at the 1958 British Empire and Commonwealth Games
Fencers at the 1960 Summer Olympics
Medalists at the 1956 Summer Olympics
Members of the Order of the British Empire
Olympic fencers of Great Britain
Olympic gold medallists for Great Britain
Olympic medalists in fencing
People educated at Queen's College, London
People from Willesden
Sportspeople from London
Medallists at the 1954 British Empire and Commonwealth Games
Medallists at the 1958 British Empire and Commonwealth Games